Bontuchel is a hamlet in Denbighshire, Wales, located  by road west of Ruthin. The father of Calvinist Isaac Hughes hailed from Bontuchel.

References

Villages in Denbighshire